Ring Around the Clock (Italian: Vogliamoci bene!) is a 1950 Italian comedy film directed by Paolo William Tamburella and starring Nando Bruno, Lauro Gazzolo, and Peppino Spadaro.

The film's sets were designed by Arrigo Equini.

Plot 
A dispute breaks out in a small town over planned repairs to the historic clock.

Cast
 Nando Bruno as Parboni  
 Lauro Gazzolo as Guerrieri  
 Mario Nicotra as Police Chief  
 Peppino Spadaro as Don Paolo  
 Arturo Bragaglia as Mayor  
 Paolo Stoppa as Rocchetti  
 Patrizia Mangano as Luisa  
 Gemma Bolognesi
 Margherita Bossi as Signora Contonieri  
 Agostino Carucci as Francesco  
 Marga Cella as Signorina Guerrieri  
 Bruno Corelli 
 Alfred De Leo as Gino Maruchelli  
 Carlo Delle Piane as Vincenzo  
 Attilio Dottesio as Mario  
 Vittoria Febbi 
 Aristide Garbini as Bruno  
 Leda Gloria as Rosa  
 Zoe Incrocci as Concettina  
 Renato Malavasi as Capobanda  
 Nino Marchetti as Giulio  
 Mario Mazza as De Mori  
 Renato Micali as Sub-Chief 
 John Pasetti as Alfred  
 Arturo Pasquali as Silvestri  
 Amina Pirani Maggi 
 Franco Solva as Alfredo  
 Pietro Tordi as Fausto

References

Bibliography
 Ann C. Paietta. Saints, Clergy and Other Religious Figures on Film and Television, 1895–2003. McFarland, 2005.

External links

1950 films
1950 comedy films
Italian comedy films
1950s Italian-language films
Films scored by Alessandro Cicognini
Italian black-and-white films
1950s Italian films